The Low-Cost Guided Imaging Rocket was a weapons system under development for the US Navy as part of ONR's Low-Cost Imaging Terminal Seeker (LCITS) FNC. It transitioned as the weapon used in the Medusa Joint Capability Technology Demonstration with South Korea.  The program provided a precision guided 2.75 inch (70 mm) rocket for use with existing Hydra 70 systems in service, as such it has many similarities with the Advanced Precision Kill Weapon System program. The principal difference between the systems is that while APKWS uses terminal laser homing, requiring the target to be 'painted' until impact, LOGIR would guide to a position supplied by the launching aircraft, using imaging infrared in the terminal phase making it  a true fire-and-forget weapon. Another advantage of LOGIR was that it was "especially effective against swarm attacks by enemies like small boats, as there’s no need for ongoing guidance."

The South Korean version, designated K-LOGIR, is used on the ROK Marine Corps Bigung (Poniard) mobile coastal defense system. Bigung is a 6×6 truck fitted with 2×18-round containers for 36 rockets to counter North Korean Fast Inshore Attack Craft (FIAC), landing craft and landing vehicles. The rockets are equipped with the LCITS using IIR imaging technology with an additional low-cost inertial correction unit.

Development
South Korea's contribution in the LOGIR program are the following:
Electronics for guidance and control system (production only, design by the USA)
Electronics for control actuation system (DSP and PWM inverter board)
Assembly parts for control actuation system (CAS frame and integrated BLDC motor)
Airframe structure and fins (canard fin, CAS skin, seeker skin)
Cruciform tail fins and nozzle assembly
Warhead and fuze attachment improvement

Specifications
 Diameter: 70 mm
 Guidance: INS midcourse/Imaging infrared terminal.
 Motor: Existing Hydra 70 motors

See also
 Direct Attack Guided Rocket
 Guided Advanced Tactical Rocket - Laser
 Advanced Precision Kill Weapon System
 Roketsan Cirit

References

External links
 Air-Launched 2.75-Inch Rockets - Designation Systems
 Low-Cost Imaging Terminal Seeker (LCITS) (video)

Air-to-surface missiles of the United States